West Virginia Route 88 is a north–south state highway located within the Northern Panhandle of West Virginia. The southern terminus is at U.S. Route 250 in Limestone.

WV 88 is cosigned with U.S. Route 40 (National Road) from Elm Grove to Woodsdale. It originally terminated in Marshall County, West Virginia. Portions of WV 88 in Ohio County were originally designated as WV 91 via 29th Street and terminated in South Wheeling. A few Ohio County roads are still under the old Route 91 designation. WV 88 from National Road in Woodsdale to the intersection with WV 67 is most commonly known as Bethany Pike and some road signs refer to WV 88 south from Bethlehem as "Fairmont Pike".

Attractions
Golden Palace, Limestone
Oglebay Park, Wheeling
West Liberty University, West Liberty
Bethany College, Bethany

Major intersections

References

088
Transportation in Brooke County, West Virginia
Transportation in Marshall County, West Virginia
Transportation in Ohio County, West Virginia